The Junior Eurovision Song Contest is an annual international song competition, held every year by the European Broadcasting Union (EBU) since 2003. This page is a list of people who have acted as presenters in the contest.

Since the contest began in 2003, it has generally had two presenters. However, in 2022 there were four presenters; in 2009, 2018, 2019, 2020, and 2021 there were three presenters; and in 2014 and 2015 it was hosted by just one presenter. Kim-Lian van der Meij (Netherlands), Timur Miroshnychenko (Ukraine) and Ida Nowakowska (Poland) have all hosted the contest twice. Kim-Lian hosted in 2007 and 2012, Miroshnychenko hosted in 2009 and 2013, and Nowakowska hosted in 2019 and 2020.

Presenters

Opening event presenters

Presenters born outside the host country

 Nadia Hasnaoui, born in Morocco to a Moroccan father and Norwegian mother.
 Zlata Ognevich, born in Murmansk, Russian SFSR, Soviet Union (present-day Russia).
 Olivier Minne, born in Belgium to a Belgian father and French mother.
 Karina Ignatyan, born in Kaluga, Russia.

Presenters who also appeared at Eurovision
 Ani Lorak represented Ukraine in the Eurovision Song Contest 2008, finishing in 2nd place.
 Camilla Ottesen presented the Danish results in the Eurovision Song Contest 2004 in Istanbul, Turkey.
 Nadia Hasnaoui co-hosted the Eurovision Song Contest 2010 in Oslo and has also presented the Norwegian results in the Eurovision Song Contest 2011 and 2012. 
 Maureen Louys has given out the votes from Belgium in the Eurovision Song Contest in 2007, 2009 and 2011.
 Remee co-wrote the German entry for the Eurovision Song Contest 2008, "Disappear", performed by No Angels. He later co-wrote "Should've Known Better", "The Way You Are", and "The Show", the Danish entries for the Eurovision Song Contest 2012, 2015 and 2022 respectively.
 Andreea Marin Bănică has presented the Romanian votes at the Eurovision Song Contest in 2000, 2004, 2006, and 2007.
 Denis Kourian is the commentator for Belarus at the Eurovision Song Contest and has presented the points of Belarus at the Eurovision Song Contest 2004.
 Leila Ismailava has presented the Belarusian votes at the Eurovision Song Contest 2011.
 Avet Barseghyan co-wrote the Armenian entry for the Eurovision Song Contest 2017, "Fly With Me", performed by Artsvik.
 Zlata Ognevich represented Ukraine in the Eurovision Song Contest 2013, ending on 3rd place.
 Moira Delia presented the Maltese votes at the Eurovision Song Contest 2006 and 2008.
 Poli Genova represented Bulgaria in the Eurovision Song Contest 2011, getting eliminated in her semi-final, ending in 12th place. She represented Bulgaria again in the Eurovision Song Contest 2016, finishing in 4th place.
 Valerie Vella presented the Maltese votes at the Eurovision Song Contest 2005. 
 Ben Camille presented the Maltese votes at the Eurovision Song Contest 2016 and 2019
 Timur Miroshnychenko co-hosted the Eurovision Song Contest 2017 in Kyiv and has been the Ukrainian commentator for Eurovision since 2007.
 Zinaida Kupriyanovich represented Belarus in the Eurovision Song Contest 2019 in Tel Aviv with “Like It".
 Rafał Brzozowski represented Poland in the Eurovision Song Contest 2021 in Rotterdam with "The Ride"
 Ida Nowakowska presented the Polish votes at the Eurovision Song Contest in 2021 and 2022.
 Aleksander Sikora has been the Polish commentator for Eurovision since 2021.
 Élodie Gossuin presented the French votes at the Eurovision Song Contest in 2016, 2017, 2018 and 2022.
 Olivier Minne presented the French votes at the Eurovision Song Contest in 1992 and 1993, and was the French commentator between 1995 and 1997.
 Carla Lazzari presented the French votes at the Eurovision Song Contest 2021.
 Iveta Mukuchyan represented Armenia in the Eurovision Song Contest 2016 in Stockholm with "LoveWave"

Presenters who formerly competed at Junior Eurovision
 Lizi Japaridze, represented  in the  contest.
 Helena Meraai, represented  in the  contest.
 Roksana Węgiel, winner of the  contest representing .
 Carla Lazzari, represented  in the  contest.
 Karina Ignatyan, represented  in the  contest.

See also 
 List of Eurovision Song Contest presenters

References

Presenters
Lists of television presenters
Masters of ceremonies

pl:Konkurs Piosenki Eurowizji dla Dzieci#Prowadzący